A Place to Call Home is the first solo album by Joey Tempest, the vocalist in the Swedish hard rock band Europe. It was released on 20 April 1995 and presented a different sound compared to Europe.

"I needed a change from the Europe sound," Tempest said in an interview, "I wanted to prove myself as a singer/songwriter for sure, but for me it was more of a journey to learn about making music. I went to see a lot of new young artists .. got into stuff like Van Morrison and Bob Dylan."

Europe guitarist John Norum made a guest appearance on the song "Right to Respect".

Track listing
All written by Joey Tempest.
 "We Come Alive" – 4:48
 "Under the Influence" – 4:41
 "A Place to Call Home" – 3:42
 "Pleasure and Pain" – 3:55
 "Elsewhere" – 3:56
 "Lord of the Manor" – 3:46
 "Don't Go Changin' on Me" – 3:26
 "Harder to Leave a Friend Than a Lover" – 3:49
 "Right to Respect" – 2:50
 "Always a Friend of Mine" – 4:01
 "How Come You're Not Dead Yet" – 4:29
 "For My Country" – 3:50

Personnel
Joey Tempest – lead vocals, guitars
Jonas Isacsson, Staffan Astner, Jesper Lindberg, John Norum – guitars
Dan Sundquist – guitars, bass, piano
Svante Henryson, Sven Lindvall – bass
Mats Asplen – organ
Nicci Wallin, Per Lindvall, Christer Jansson – drums

Album credits
Dan Sundqvist – producer
Alar Suuma – mixing
Pontus Olsson – mixing on tracks 3 and 7, engineer
Nick Hopkins – engineer
Robert Wellerfors – mastering
Dan Håfström – production assistant
Joel Berg – art direction
John Scarisbrick, Per Zennström – photography

References

Joey Tempest albums
1995 debut albums